The CB postcode area, also known as the Cambridge postcode area, is a group of sixteen postcode districts in the east of England, within five post towns. These cover much of south and east Cambridgeshire (including Cambridge and Ely), plus parts of west Suffolk (including Newmarket and Haverhill) and north-west Essex (including Saffron Walden) and a very small part of Norfolk.

Districts CB21 to CB25 were formed in September 2006 from the parts of districts CB1 to CB5 lying outside of the city of Cambridge.



Coverage
The approximate coverage of the postcode districts:

|-
! CB1
| CAMBRIDGE
| Cambridge (Central, South), Teversham (parts of)
| Cambridge, South Cambridgeshire
|-
! CB2
| CAMBRIDGE
| Cambridge (West)
| Cambridge, South Cambridgeshire
|-
! CB3
| CAMBRIDGE
| Cambridge (North-West), Girton
| Cambridge, South Cambridgeshire
|-
! CB4
| CAMBRIDGE
| Cambridge (North)
| Cambridge, South Cambridgeshire
|-
! CB5
| CAMBRIDGE
| Cambridge (East)
| Cambridge, South Cambridgeshire
|-
! CB6
| ELY
| Aldreth, Apes Hall, Chettisham, Coveney, Ely (west), Haddenham, Little Downham, Little Thetford, Littleport, Mepal, Pymore, Stretham, Sutton, Wardy Hill, Wentworth, Wilburton, Witcham, Witchford
| East Cambridgeshire, King's Lynn and West Norfolk, Fenland
|-
! CB7
| ELY
| Barway, Brandon Bank, Brandon Creek, Broad Hill, Chippenham, Down Field, Ely (east), Fordham, Isleham, Prickwillow, Queen Adelaide, River Bank, Soham, Stuntney, Upware, Wicken
| East Cambridgeshire, West Suffolk 
|-
! CB8
| NEWMARKET
| Ashley, Brinkley, Burrough End, Burrough Green, Carlton, Cheveley, Clopton Green, Cowlinge, Dalham, Denston, Ditton Green, Dullingham, Dunstall Green, Exning, Gazeley, Great Bradley, Kennett, Kentford, Kirtling, Kirtling Green, Lady's Green, Landwade, Lidgate, Moulton, Newmarket, Ousden, Saxon Street, Six Mile Bottom, Snailwell, Stetchworth, Stradishall, Thorns, Upend, Westley Waterless, Wickhambrook, Woodditton
| West Suffolk, East Cambridgeshire, South Cambridgeshire
|-
! CB9
| HAVERHILL
| Barnardiston, Great Thurlow, Great Wratting, Haverhill, Helions Bumpstead, Kedington, Little Bradley, Little Thurlow, Little Wratting, Steeple Bumpstead, Sturmer, Withersfield
| West Suffolk, Braintree
|-
! CB10
| SAFFRON WALDEN
| Ashdon, Church End, Great Chesterford, Great Sampford, Hempstead, Hinxton, Howlett End, Ickleton, Little Chesterford, Little Sampford, Little Walden, Radwinter, Red Oaks Hill, Saffron Walden (north), Sewards End, Wimbish, Wimbish Green
| Uttlesford, South Cambridgeshire
|-
! CB11
| SAFFRON WALDEN
| Arkesden, Audley End, Clavering, Debden, Debden Green, Duddenhoe End, Elmdon, Langley, Littlebury, Littlebury Green, Newport, Pond Street, Quendon, Rickling, Rickling Green, Saffron Walden (south), Shortgrove, Starling's Green, Strethall, Upper Green, Wendens Ambo, Wicken Bonhunt, Widdington
| Uttlesford
|-
! CB21
| CAMBRIDGE
| Fulbourn, Great and Little Wilbraham, West Wratting, Weston Colville, Teversham (parts of), Abington (incl. Little), Hildersham, Bartlow, Hadstock, Horseheath, Shudy Camps, West Wickham, Castle Camps, Balsham, Linton
| South Cambridgeshire, Uttlesford, Cambridge
|-
! CB22
| CAMBRIDGE
| Babraham, Sawston, Pampisford, Duxford, Whittlesford, Great and Little Shelford, Stapleford, Harston, Barrington, Hauxton, Newton, Foxton
| South Cambridgeshire, Cambridge
|-
! CB23
| CAMBRIDGE
| Cambourne (Great, Lower and Upper), Barton, Comberton, Harlton, Great and Little Eversden, Bourn, Highfields Caldecote, Coton, Haslingfield, Kingston, Hardwick, Toft, Longstowe, Madingley, Dry Drayton, Papworth Everard, Lolworth, Bar Hill, Elsworth, Knapwell, Conington, Boxworth, Caxton, Papworth Saint Agnes
| South Cambridgeshire, Cambridge
|-
! CB24
| CAMBRIDGE
| Impington, Histon, Oakington, Longstanton, Willingham, Swavesey, Over, Fen Drayton, Milton, Rampton, Cottenham (parts of), Northstowe
| South Cambridgeshire. Cambridge
|-
! CB25
| CAMBRIDGE
| Cottenham (parts of), Landbeach, Rampton, Burwell, Swaffham Bulbeck, Swaffham Prior, Stow-Cum-Quy, Bottisham, Lode, Waterbeach, Horningsea, Chittering
| South Cambridgeshire, East Cambridgeshire, Cambridge
|}

Map

See also
List of postcode areas in the United Kingdom
Postcode Address File

References

External links
Cambridge Postcode Checker 
Royal Mail's Postcode Address File
A quick introduction to Royal Mail's Postcode Address File (PAF)

Geography of Cambridge
Postcode areas covering the East of England